Senica is a town in Trnava Region, western Slovakia. It is located in the north-eastern part of the Záhorie lowland, close to the Little Carpathians.

Etymology
The name is derived from the word seno ("hay") with the suffix -ica used to form a place name.

History
Senica's history is closely related with the Branč castle, built in 1251–1261. It was first mentioned in 1256 and received its city privileges in 1396, confirmed in 1463 and 1492. The city was affected by Turkish wars, anti-Habsburg uprisings and reformation and counter-reformations in the 17th century. In 1746, it became seat of a district within the Nitra county.

Demographics
According to the 2001 census, the city had 21,253 inhabitants. 96.40% of inhabitants were Slovaks, 1.56% Czechs, 0.84% Roma and 0.14 Hungarians. The religious makeup was 47.28% Roman Catholics, 31.18% people with no religious affiliation, and 17.03% Lutherans.

Industry
A significant silk-producing company is based in Senica. The company was established in 1954 under the name ″Slovenský hodváb". In 2005 the production of viscose rayon was halted. After the merger of Slovenský hodváb and Kord to the new company Slovkor, it continued only with the production of Synthetic fiber for technical purposes. In February 2014 the factory chimney, which dominated the city more than half century and was visible from long distance, was demolished.

OMS lighting, one of the biggest luminaire companies in East-Central Europe, is also based in Senica. With around 1000 employees and exporting 98% of its production to more than 100 countries, the company is a referent in the economy of Senica.

Sport
Senica is one of the locations where Slovak Bandy Association has organised rink bandy sessions. The club is called Športový klub Rytieri Bandy Senica and was founded in 2018.

Twin towns – sister cities

Senica is twinned with:
 Bač, Serbia (2004)
 Herzogenbuchsee, Switzerland (2004)
 Pułtusk, Poland (2002)
 Trutnov, Czech Republic (1998)
 Velké Pavlovice, Czech Republic (2002)
 Santa Tecla, El Salvador (2012)

See also 
 Banská Štiavnica, Slovakia (German: Schemnitz)
 Church of the Virgin Mary (Senica)
 List of municipalities and towns in Slovakia

References

Notes

External links

Municipal website 
Senica at tourist-channel.sk
Senica – detailed map guide

 
Cities and towns in Slovakia